Philip Malcolm "Pip" Williams (born 7 October 1947) is an English record producer, arranger and guitarist, best known for producing albums for Status Quo and The Moody Blues and acting as well as supervising the orchestra parts and orchestra arrangements for the Finnish metal band Nightwish.

Career
Williams was born in Hillingdon, Middlesex. He became inspired to play the guitar after listening to records by The Shadows and Buddy Holly. He started his musical career as guitarist for The Fantastics and Jimmy James and the Vagabonds. Progressing from performer to session musician in the early 1970s under the patronage of Sweet producer Phil Wainman, he became one of the most in-demand session guitarists of the era, playing on early hit records for Sweet including "Funny Funny", "Co-Co", "Poppa Joe" and "Little Willy", and on The Walker Brothers' hit "No Regrets".

He moved into production in the late 1970s; his work for Graham Bonnet attracted the attention of Status Quo, who hired him to produce their album Rockin' All Over the World. He produced a further nine albums for the group, the most recent their 2007 effort, In Search of the Fourth Chord. He is also known for producing The Moody Blues albums Long Distance Voyager and The Present, the former being a United States Billboard 200 hit. In 1984 he produced "I Should Have Known Better" for Jim Diamond, which topped the UK Singles Chart. Other collaborators include Shirley Bassey, Richard O'Brien, Dr. Feelgood, Barclay James Harvest, Bucks Fizz, Kevin Ayers, Geordie and Uriah Heep (Sonic Origami). He also produced and co-wrote a number of tracks on Sweet's 1980 album, Waters Edge, and worked with their singer, Brian Connolly, on a number of his solo efforts.

Williams is also a prolific arranger, from the string arrangements for the Moody Blues and Colin Blunstone, to the oriental ostinato patterns on Carl Douglas' "Kung Fu Fighting". Other collaborators in this field include Barbara Dickson, Ringo Starr, The Sensational Alex Harvey Band and The Kinks. His most recent work in this field has been with the Finnish symphonic metal group Nightwish, having contributed orchestral arrangements for their 2004 album, Once, its 2007 follow up Dark Passion Play, their 2011 album Imaginaerum, their 2015 album, Endless Forms Most Beautiful and its 2020 follow up Human. :II: Nature.. He also worked at the band's leader and keyboardist's first solo album, Music Inspired by the Life and Times of Scrooge. Williams also has recorded, produced and mixed a live album for the Bonzo Dog Doo-Dah Band. He has as well orchestrated several songs for Indica on their 2010 album A Way Away .

Williams is currently a course leader teaching music technology at University of West London, Ealing. He now lives in Slough, Berkshire and has two children.

See also
London College of Music

References

External links
The Art of Record Production Conference, London @ Musictank.co.uk

1947 births
Living people
English record producers
Academics of the University of West London
People from Hillingdon
English pop guitarists
English male guitarists
Status Quo (band)
English session musicians